Roel Ragay Degamo (April 29, 1966 – March 4, 2023) was a Filipino politician who served as governor of Negros Oriental from 2011 to June 2022, and again from October 2022 until his assassination on March 4, 2023. He previously served as the province's vice governor from 2010 to 2011, and was a municipal councilor of Siaton from 1998 to 2007.

In the 2010 elections, he garnered the most votes for the Negros Oriental Provincial Board. With the successive deaths of the elected governor and vice governor, Degamo ascended to the governorship in January 2011. He was suspended from office in October 2017 until January 2018 due to three dismissal orders from the Office of the Ombudsman stemming from allegations of misappropriating public funds. He successfully appealed his suspension and dismissal.

Degamo lost the gubernatorial race to Pryde Henry Teves in the May 2022 elections. However, back in October 2021,  during the run-up to the elections, Degamo filed an electoral complaint to have another gubernatorial candidate—an almost namesake known as "Ruel Degamo"—be declared a nuisance candidate meant to "confuse and deceive" the electorate. The Commission on Elections (COMELEC) ruled in the governor's favor, however, the latter candidate filed an appeal. The election pushed through before COMELEC made a final ruling on the case. In June 2022, a defeated Degamo filed a petition for mandamus at the Supreme Court, which compelled COMELEC to resolve the case. On October 3, 2022, COMELEC upheld their earlier decision and transferred votes obtained by Ruel to Roel, proclaiming him the election's true winner. 

On March 4, 2023, he was assassinated by a group of armed men at his home in Pamplona, Negros Oriental.

Personal life
Roel Ragay Degamo was born in Bonawon in the municipality of Siaton, Negros Oriental on April 29, 1966. He finished his primary and secondary education in his hometown and in Dumaguete, respectively; then earned his bachelor's degree in mechanical engineering from Silliman University in 1989. He passed the licensure examinations that same year.

Degamo's widow is incumbent Pamplona, Negros Oriental mayor Janice Vallega-Degamo.

Political career

Siaton Municipal Council (1998–2007) 

Degamo started his political career in his hometown of Siaton, serving three consecutive terms in the Sangguniang Bayan (municipal council) from 1998 to 2007. He concurrently served as president of the Provincial Councilors League (PCL) of Negros Oriental from 2004 to 2007, making him an ex officio member of the Negros Oriental Provincial Board. He was also elected as Region VII chairperson, which entitled him to a seat in the National Board of the Philippine Councilor's League.

Vice Governor of Negros Oriental (2010–2011)

In the 2010 elections he ran for a regular seat in the Negros Oriental Provincial Board, and won with the highest number of votes, representing the 3rd legislative district of the province. Degamo assumed the position of vice-governor when vice governor-elect Agustin Perdices assumed the gubernatorial position vacated by the elected governor Emilio Macias II, who died before taking his oath of office for another term. However, Governor Perdices died in January 2011 and in accordance with the Local Government Code, Degamo became the governor.

Governor of Negros Oriental (2011–2023)

First four terms (2011–2022)
After serving the remainder of Perdices' term, Degamo was elected governor on his own right for three consecutive terms: in 2013 (under PDP–Laban), in 2016 (under National Unity Party), and in 2019 (under Nacionalista Party).

Controversies
Degamo had received three dismissal orders from the Office of the Ombudsman during his tenure from 2011 to 2022:
In 2016, the Office of the Ombudsman ordered Degamo's dismissal for alleged calamity fund misuse from Typhoon Sendong in 2011 worth P480 million, but he was able to secure a 60-day Temporary Restraining Order (TRO) from the Court of Appeals blocking the suspension.
In 2017, Degamo was suspended for three months for alleged usurpation of calamity funds from the 6.9 magnitude earthquake in 2012. Then vice governor Mark Macias took over the governorship in an acting capacity for 90 days.
Also in late 2017, while Degamo was serving his suspension, the Office of the Ombudsman issued another dismissal order against Degamo after he was found guilty of grave misconduct over alleged misuse of  worth of intelligence funds in 2013. While on suspension, Degamo was able to secure another Temporary Restraining Order (TRO) from the Court of Appeals on January 11, 2018 to block the dismissal order but the Supreme Court dissolved the TRO on November 13, 2019. However, it was later revealed that the Court of Appeals already resolved the case and cleared Degamo as early as September 2019, hindering once again his dismissal.

2022 elections and fifth term
Degamo, running under Nacionalista Party, sought re-election in 2022 for a fourth consecutive term after the Commission on Elections (COMELEC) controversially allowed him to run despite completing three straight terms claiming that his three terms in office were interrupted a number of times following suspension and dismissal orders by the Office of the Ombudsman, but lost to Bayawan City mayor Pryde Henry Teves. Teves took his oath of office on June 30, 2022, however, Teves and Degamo had a brief standoff for hours as Degamo refused to vacate the office, but eventually conceded and exited after negotiations.

Earlier, on December 16, 2021, a COMELEC division granted the petition filed by Degamo declaring another gubernatorial candidate, a certain Ruel Degamo, whose real name is Grego Gaudia, as a nuisance. However, the almost-imitated name (Ruel Degamo) remained on the official ballot pending a final COMELEC en banc ruling by election day. On September 1, 2022, the commission denied the motion for reconsideration filed by Gaudia, upholding its earlier ruling.

Later that month, the COMELEC, deciding with finality on the declaration about Gaudia, moved to nullify the victory of Teves. The votes garnered by Gaudia would be credited to Degamo, surpassing those by Teves; therefore enough to win. Degamo was proclaimed on October 3, and yet to report to the provincial capitol to assume the governorship once again.

Degamo took his oath before President Bongbong Marcos at the Malacañang Palace on October 5. Meanwhile, Teves, refusing to step down, had filed an appeal before the Supreme Court (SC) to contest the latest COMELEC ruling, which was expected to be decided by October 11.

However, on that date, the SC had not acted yet on the appeal; Teves later voluntarily relinquished the governorship.

On February 14, 2023, the SC en banc dismissed the petitions separately filed by Teves, as well as by Gaudia; thus, the COMELEC's declaration of Degamo's victory was affirmed.

Death

On March 4, 2023 at approximately 9:36 a.m., Degamo was shot several times by unidentified men at his residence in Pamplona, Negros Oriental. He was distributing aid to local beneficiaries of the Pantawid Pamilyang Pilipino Program (4Ps) program when the attack happened. He was rushed to Negros Polymedic Hospital in Sibulan, but was pronounced dead at 11:41 a.m. Eight other people were also killed in the shooting, along with 15 injured.

He was later interred at his family mausoleum in Siaton, alongside his parents and sister.

Four suspects were later arrested in Bayawan; another surrendered. Criminal charges were separately filed against those arrested, as well as twelve John Does, before the Regional Trial Courts (RTCs) in two cities in the province. The cases, thirty in total, were later transferred by the Supreme Court to the Manila RTC.

Another suspect died in an encounter with state forces.

Notes

References

External links
Province of Negros Oriental official website

1966 births
2023 deaths
Politicians from Negros Oriental
Governors of Negros Oriental
Assassinated Filipino politicians
Nacionalista Party politicians
United Nationalist Alliance politicians
Silliman University alumni
20th-century Filipino politicians
21st-century Filipino politicians